Abersychan Low Level railway station served the town of Abersychan in the Welsh county of Monmouthshire. It was located near the junction of the A4043 and the B4246 at the eastern end of the town.

History
The station was opened as "Abersychan" by the Monmouthshire Railway and Canal Company on 2 October 1854. By this time the Monmouthshire was for most practical purposes part of the Great Western Railway, which had worked it from August 1875 and eventually took it over with effect from 1 August 1880.

The line then passed on to the Western Region of British Railways on nationalisation in 1948. At a time of withdrawal of services on a number of other lines in South Wales, the station was closed to passengers by the British Transport Commission on 30 April 1962 and to goods in May 1962. At the time of closure the station had an approximately hourly service in each direction.

The site today
The site is now a residential development behind the Rising Sun public house.

References

Notes

Sources

External links
Position on 1940s map
Station on a navigable 1947 O.S. map

Disused railway stations in Torfaen
History of Monmouthshire
Former Great Western Railway stations
Railway stations in Great Britain opened in 1854
Railway stations in Great Britain closed in 1962
1854 establishments in Wales